White catfish may refer to:

 Silonia childreni, native to South Asia
 Ameiurus catus, native to North America